Gwynn Park High School (GPHS) is in Brandywine census-designated place, Prince George's County, Maryland, United States, a suburban area near Washington DC.

It serves the following CDPs: Brandywine, Accokeek, Aquasco, Baden, Cedarville, and portions of Croom. It also serves the Town of Eagle Harbor.

Sports
The school has won state championships in boys basketball in 1968, 1969, 1970, 1972, 1974, 1976, 1980, 1983, 1987, 1988; girls basketball in 1974, 2002, 2003, 2004; baseball in 1984; Boys Outdoor Track and Field 2002 and  football in 2005.

Notable alumni 

Kyle Arrington, Baltimore Ravens cornerback
Rashad Carmichael, cornerback
Isaiah Coulter, wide receiver
James Albert Graham, Congressional Medal of Honor recipient in Vietnam honored at Arlington National Cemetery
Jarrett Hurd, professional boxer
Seth Mitchell, professional boxer
Adrian Moten, linebacker
Rose Catherine Pinkney, television executive
Tre Sullivan, NFL player
Phil Taylor, Washington Redskins defensive tackle

References

External links 
 Gwynn Park High School
 

Public high schools in Maryland
Schools in Prince George's County, Maryland
Educational institutions established in 1956
1956 establishments in Maryland